Myths and Legends is a collectible card game based on universal mythologies, developed in 2000 in Santiago, Chile. The game currently counts with 39 sets and over 3000 different cards. It is the only collectible card game fully produced and developed in Latin-America, with some expansions translated into the English and German languages. The game was released in Europe, United States, Oceania and Latin America. In January 2010, the game went into "indefinite recess" due to the bankruptcy of the publisher, Salo. In October 2014 the game was officially brought back to print with the release of Furia, a 190-card expansion that saw the return of many of the original artists to the game.

Types of cards

A Myths and Legends deck is made up of five types of cards: Allies, Totems, Talismans, Weapons and Gold cards (Kingdom cards being used only during the Genesis Era). Each card has its own special function with some common characteristics. Each card's Gold cost is indicated in the upper right-hand corner. Cards without a number are usually Gold cards. The upper left-hand corner indicates the card type, with Totems, Weapons, and Talismans all having individual symbol, and Allies having a Strength number.

Totems are cards that grant specific abilities. The card's abilities can usually be activated as long as the Totem remains in play. Totems are played in the player's Support Line area.

Allies are warrior cards used to defend your Castle Deck or to attack your opponent's Castle. Note that these are the only cards that may be assigned in the Mythological Battle Phase. An Ally cannot attack unless it has been in play and under your control from the beginning of the turn. However, you can always use it to either block or activate its abilities.

Talismans are one-time use cards with specific effects. To play a Talisman, a player must first pay its Gold cost, show the card to their opponent, resolve the effect of the card and finally send it to the Ruin Pile.

Gold Cards are the resource used by players to play cards. Every time a player plays a non-Gold card, they move a number of Gold cards equal to the non-Gold card's cost from the Reserve area to the Used Gold area. This action is called payment in Gold. Players begin the game with one Gold Card in play, and can add a gold card to their Gold Reserve each turn.

Weapons are "attached to" (slid underneath) Allies already in play. Only one Weapon may be attached to an Ally at any time, and once attached to an Ally, a Weapon cannot be removed or transferred to another Ally.

Kingdom cards are featured in Genesis Era sets; these cards are chosen before the beginning of the duel, and only one Kingdom card can be played in a deck. Kingdom cards have effects that can be activated at any time, but only once per duel, and their effect cannot be prevented.

Starting the game
Before beginning the game, both players search their Castle Deck for one Gold card and place it into their Gold Reserve areas. A player may only choose a Normal Gold card at the beginning of the game. Then the players shuffle their decks and pass the deck to an opponent to cut. The starting player is chosen randomly.

The hand

Each player draws eight cards from the top of their Castle Deck to get their starting hand. Beginning with the first player, if a player does not want his or her starting hand, they can perform a mulligan as many times as they want, every time drawing one less card.

Winning the game

A player wins a round when the other player draws or ruins the last card of their Castle Deck. In a full game of Myths and Legends, the first player to win two rounds becomes the winner of the game.

Special abilities
As in other card games, Myths and Legends uses keywords or mechanics in order to simplify many effects of the card. Many of these effects have been continually used through the game, while other have been discarded due to overuse or because of balance issues.

Única (Unique) - Only one copy of a Única card is allowed per deck.
Orbe (Orb) - Orbe cards work with the following effects: it is considered a Única card and can only by affected by card that specifically target Orbe cards.
Mercenario (Mercenary) - You are allowed to have more than 3 copies of a Mercenario card per deck.
Relámpago (Lightning) - A Relámpago card can be played at the beginning of any phase or step of the turn.
Maquinaria (Machinery) - An ability exclusive to Arma cards. A Maquinaria card is played in the Support Line and can only activate its effects as long his/her controller has one ally in play.
Tamaño X (Size X) - A sub ability for Maquinaria cards. In order to use the Maquinaria effects, a player must control X or more allies. 
Embarcación (Craft) - An ability exclusive to Arma cards. Similar to Maquinaria cards, Embarcación cards are played in the Support Line, except that this card doesn't need an ally in play in order to use their effects.
Errante (Wandering) - A player can only control one copy of  an Errante card one at a time. If by any reason a player controls 2 or more copies of an Errante card, he must remove them from play.
Réplica X (Replica X) - An ability exclusive to Talismán cards. When a Talisman card with Réplica is played, his/her owner can pay the Réplica cost. If done, the effects of the Talismán are used twice. Usually the Réplica cost is paid in gold, although many card offer alternatives like discarting card, destroying allies, and so on. Other Réplica cards, rather than copying the effect of the card, offer a second effect that can only be used by the payment of the Réplica cost.
Furia (Fury) - An ability exclusive to Aliado cards. An ally with Furia can attack the same turn that was summoned.
Imbloqueable (Unblockable) - Exclusive to Aliado cards. Can not be blocked by other allies.
Indestructible (Indestructible) - Can not be destroyed by damage nor by effects (It still can be Vanished or returned to the hand or deck).
Indesterrable (Indesterrable) - Cannot be vanished from the game (it still can be destroyed by damage or by effects; or returned to the hand or deck). 
Lealtad (Loyalty) - A card with Lealtad can not be controlled by the opponent, if by any reason a card with Lealtad is controlled by the opponent, the card is moved immediately to his/her owner.
Inmunidad X (Immunity X) - A card with Inmunidad can not be the target of effects that comes from X (Where X is any specific type of card or race). Example: Inmunidad: Talismanes- can not be affected by the effects of any Talisman card; Inmunidad:Dragones- can not be the target of dragon type allies, although it can be affected by other type of allies.
Guardián (Guardian) - Exclusive to Aliado cards. An Aliado with Guardián can not be sent out to attack.
Embestida X (assault X) - Exclusive to Aliado cards. When an Aliado with Embestida X is blocked, the opponent receives X damage, regardless of the difference in strength of the attacking or blocking allies. This ability was discontinued after several players complained for an abuse of this ability. The ability was later redefined to be as follows: any damage that an ally makes to a deck is doubled. 
Oro Inicial (Initial Gold) - Exclusive to Oro cards. The owner is allowed to start the game with this card, even if the card has an effect.
Exhumar (Exhume) - Any card with Exhumar can be played from the graveyard as it where in your hand. However, if the card played was a Talisman, the card is Vanished.
Retorno (Return) - Any card with Retorno can be played from the Exile zone. If the card played was a Talisman, vanish the card.
Barrera (Barrier) - If a card with Barrera is dropped from your deck because of damage, you can vanish the Barrera card and stop any further deck drop.
Evasión X (Evasion X) - Exclusive to Aliados. Each time an Evasión card blocks, his/her owner recovers X cards from the graveyard to the deck. This ability was discontinued as tended to prolong the game, causing troubles in official tournaments, where the limit time per game is one hour.
Traición X (Betrayal X) - During the main phase, any player could pay the Traición cost of a card in order to gain its control. Usually the Traición cost was paid with gold; however, other cards accepted other types of payments, live dropping cards, discarding, and so on.
Absorción (Absorption) - Any damage targeted to the deck, but intercepted by an Absorción Ally, is reduced to zero.
Retador (Challenger) - Each time a Retador card attacks, its controller may select the opponent ally who must block it.
Temerario (Bold) - Allies with Temerario can only be blocked by another Temerario ally.
Inmortal (Immortal) - While not properly an ability, Inmortal worked as a "title" that allowed to interact with other cards that specified Inmortal card.

Sets

This game is divided into sets, and each set showcases a different type of mythology.
The sets are as follows:

El Reto (The Challenge) - (universal mythology)
Mundo Gótico (Gothic World) - (mythology of the war between the light and the darkness)
La Ira del Nahual (The Nahual's Fury) - (Indian-American mythology)
Ragnarok - (Nordic mythology)
La Cofradía (Brotherhood) - (a recompilation of the previous editions)
Espíritu de Dragón (Dragoon Spirit) - (Chinese and Japanese mythology)

From here begins the segunda era (second age). Cards from previous editions cannot be added to segunda era decks.

Espada Sagrada (Sacred Sword) - (English medieval mythology, specially the Arthurian cycle)
Cruzadas (Crusades) - (an extension of Espada Sagrada)
Helénica (Hellenic) - (Greek mythology)
Imperio (Empire) - (an extension of Helenica, Roman mythology)
Hijos de Daana (Daana's Children) - (Celtic mythology)
Tierras Altas (Highlands) - (an extension of Hijos de Daana)
Dominios de Ra (Ra's Domains) - (Egyptian mythology)
Encrucijada (Crossroads) - (an extension of Dominios de Ra, the Persian and Ptolemaic rule)
Guerrero Jaguar (Jaguar Warrior) - (Aztec and Mayan mythology)
Vendaval (Gale) - (an extension of Guerrero Jaguar, South American mythology)
Compendium - (a recompilation of cards from Espada Sagrada to Tierras Altas)
Barbarie (Barbarism) - (medieval mythology, from the fall of the Roman Empire to Charlemagne's reign)
Reino de Acero (Steel Kingdom) - (war of the 100 years)
Hordas (Hordes) - (Mongolian invasion to Europe)
Bestiario (Bestiaire) - (dark creatures)
Extensión Compendium II Era - an extension of Compendium, includes cards from Espada Sagrada to Vendaval
Heroes - (extension of Bestiario, presents heroes and forces of good [as opposed to Bestiario's forces of dark])
Codigo Samurai (Samurai Code) - (feudal Japan culture and mythology)
Katana - (extension of Codigo Samurai)
Heroes, la gloria tiene su precio (Heroes, glory has a price) - (Chilean independentist history)
Piratas (Pirates) - (the story of the pirates through the seven seas)
Corsarios (Privateers) - (an extension of Piratas, it's about the history of buccaneers)
Inmortales(Immortals) - (re-illustrated characters from Espada Sagrada to Vendaval)
Dunas (Dunes) - (the tales of Sheresade and the thousand-one nights)
Origenes (Origins) - (Chilean myths)
Invasión (Invasion) - (the battle of the Greeks and Persians in the Thermopylae)
Insurgentes - (Mexican revolutionary history)
Profecias (Prophecies) - (Characters and events from the Old Testament)
Éxodo (Exodus) - (the story of the Book of Exodus)
Vikingos (Vikings) - (myths from the land of Asgard)

From here begins MyL Genesis. New rules were added to the game. As it happened with segunda era, cards from the early sets are not compatible with these sets.

Conquista (Conquest) - (the arrival of the Spaniards to the new world)
Trincheras (Trenches) - (First World War with a modern look)
Apocalipsis  (Apocalypse) - (the war within light and darkness)
Condenados (Damned) - (battles of the vampires and werewolves) - cancelled

After a 4-year hiatus, the game was reedited with new content. Many segunda era block mechanics were brought back, ignoring the multi-color aspect of "Genesis". No cards from previous sets are compatible.

Furia (Fury) - Greek, Egyptian, Norse and Medieval mythology. The last one with little to no coverage - First set in 4 years of hiatus.
Furia: Extensión (Fury:Expansion) - Continues with the previous set, this time with more coverage of Egyptian mythology.
Sumeria (Sumer) - Sumerian culture and mythology.
Sumeria:rebelión (Sumer: Rebellion)" - Expands further more the Sumer culture. Additionally makes a brief mention of the Persian invasion.
Asgard - Nordic Mythology, focused on the Aesir and the reign of Odin.
Midgard - Conclusion of the Nordic chapter. It reintroduces the Dragon creature type.
Cámelot (Camelot) - Medieval mythology focused around the Arthurian tale. Starting with this set, cards started being printed in Belgium notably increasing the cardboard quality. Any card previously was printed in Chile.
Templarios (Templars) - Concludes the Arthurian tale, this time giving more focus to secondary characters.
Bushido -  Japanese mythology, revolving around the Samurai
Sol Naciente (Rising Sun) -  Direct expansion of Bushido. This is formally the last expansion to a set. Forward new sets would be auto-conclusive.
ContraAtaque (Counter Attack) -  Reprint set from Furia to Midgard
Águila Imperial (Imperial Eagle) -  Focusing on Roman history and myths.
Steampunk - Complete collection in a single product. This set is the first whose main focus revolves around fictional characters, particularly from literary works of the XVIII and XIX centuries.
Axi Mundi - Global mythology.
Hijos del Sol (Children of the Sun) - Mesoamerican mythology and historical figures.
Legado Gotico (Gothic Legacy) - General European mythology. A legacy set from the original Gothic Legacy.
Kemeth  - Egyptian mythology and historical figures.
Dharma - Hinduism mythology and historical figures.
Olimpia - Greek mythology and historical figures.
Calavera (Skull) - Sea myths and historical figures from The Golden Age of Piracy.
Kilimanjaro - Myths and historical figures from African cultures.

References

External links
 Mitos y Leyendas - Official website 

Card games introduced in 2000
Collectible card games